Urzędów County was a powiat (county) within Lublin Voivodeship in the Polish–Lithuanian Commonwealth (16th-18th centuries). Today, Urzędów belongs to the Kraśnik County.

Urzedow County was created some time in the late 15th century, when Lublin Voivodeship was carved out of eastern part of Sandomierz Voivodeship. The new voivodeship was made of three counties - Lukow County, Lublin County and Urzedow County, whose area in the late 16th century was 1028 sq. kilometers. Apart from Urzedow, it included such towns, as Bilgoraj, Krasnik, Janow Lubelski, Frampol, Opole Lubelskie, and Goraj. Urzedow became the seat of local administration (starosta) because, in the 15th century, sejmiks took place here.

By the second half of the 17th century, the area of Urzedow County grew to 3293 sq. kilometers, because its boundary moved northwards, at the expense of neighboring Lublin County. At that time, such locations as Opole Lubelskie, Chodel, Ratoszyn Pierwszy, Wilkolaz and Bychawa were annexed into Urzedow County.

Largest town of the county was Krasnik, whose population in the mid 17th century reached over 4000, which made it second largest city of the voivodeship, after Lublin (pop. 10 000). At the same time, Urzedow had the population of 2000.

Urzedow County was disbanded after the third partition of Poland (1795). In the Duchy of Warsaw and Russian-controlled Congress Poland, most of its territory belonged to Krasnik County and Bilgoraj County.

References

External links 
 History of Urzedow County

Geography of Lublin Voivodeship
Former counties of Poland
History of Lesser Poland